The AAW Women's Championship is a women's professional wrestling championship created and promoted by the American professional wrestling promotion All American Wrestling. There have been a total of nine reigns shared between eight defferent champions. The current champion is Masha Slamovich, who is in her first reign.

History 
From August 5 to December 2, 2018, AAW held a tournament to crown the inaugural champion between twelve wrestlers: Allysin Kay, Britt Baker, Candice LeRae, Delilah Doom, Ivelisse, Jessicka Havok, Kylie Rae, Leah Vaughan, Rachael Ellering, Samantha Heights, Su Yung and Veda Scott. In the tournament finals, Havok defeated Ellering and Ivelisse On December 2, 2018, at AAW Legacy to become the inaugural champion.

Reigns 
Jessicka Havok was the inaugural champion and has the most reigns at two. Kris Statlander's reign is the longest at 559, while Kylie Rae's reign is the shortest at 112 days. Allysin Kay is the oldest champion at 33 years old, while Skye Blue is the youngest at 22 years old.

Combined reigns 

See also
AAW Heavyweight Championship
AAW Tag Team Championship
AAW Heritage Championship

References

External links
AAW official website title history
AAW Women's Championship

Women's professional wrestling championships
AAW Wrestling championships